George Shelvey (born 22 April 2001) is an English professional footballer who plays for Nottingham Forest, as a goalkeeper.

Career
Shelvey began his career with Nottingham Forest, moving on loan to Truro City in February 2020, making 2 league appearances. He moved on loan to Wealdstone in April 2021. He moved on loan to Mansfield Town in June 2021. On 6 January 2022, Shelvey's loan with Mansfield was terminated early.

Career statistics

References

2001 births
Living people
English footballers
Nottingham Forest F.C. players
Truro City F.C. players
Wealdstone F.C. players
Mansfield Town F.C. players
Association football goalkeepers